CAIR or cair may refer to:

Acronyms 

 Carboxyaminoimidazole ribotide, a biochemical intermediate nucleotide
 Centre for Artificial Intelligence and Robotics, Indian national defence laboratory 
 Clean Air Interstate Rule, US environmental regulation
 Council on American–Islamic Relations, American Muslim advocacy organization

Geography 

 cair, an alternate spelling of caer, a Welsh placename element referring to strongholds
 Čair Municipality,  municipality of Skopje, Republic of Macedonia

Fictional 
 Cair Andros, a fictional island in Tolkien's fiction
 Cair Paravel, a castle from C. S. Lewis' The Chronicles of Narnia